Henry John "Dutch" Dotterer, Jr. (November 11, 1931 – October 9, 1999) was an American professional baseball catcher. 

A native of Syracuse, New York, he attended Syracuse University and while there was a member of Delta Kappa Epsilon fraternity (Phi Gamma).  

He threw and batted right-handed, stood 6 feet (1.8 m) tall and weighed 209 pounds (95 kg).

Dotterer played Major League Baseball with the Cincinnati Redlegs from 1957 until 1960 and with the Washington Senators as a member of the expansion Senators' 1961 debut season in the American League. 

He batted .247 in 107 career games, with five home runs and 33 runs batted in. 

In 1959, he backed up regular Cincinnati catcher Ed Bailey, hitting .267 with two homers and 17 RBI in 161 at-bats. 

At the close of the 1960 season, Dutch was traded to the Kansas City Athletics, who then left him unprotected in the 1960 Major League Baseball expansion draft, where he was acquired by Washington with the 12th pick in the player lottery.

Dutch was the only player to hit a grand slam off Sandy Koufax and the only player to twice beat Warren Spahn with extra-inning pinch hits. His grand slam against Koufax (June 10, 1960, L.A. Coliseum) provided all the Redlegs' runs in a 4-3 win.  

Dotterer made the 1961 Opening Day roster of the Senators and logged 19 at-bats with them, but on April 30 of that season he played his final MLB game, after which he spent the rest of his pro career with his hometown Syracuse Chiefs of the Triple-A International League in 1961–1962. He died in Syracuse at age 67.

His father, Dutch Dotterer, Sr., was a longtime scout with Cincinnati, the Cleveland Indians, and New York Yankees. His brother, Tom, an infielder, played minor league baseball in the Cincinnati organization. 

Also, his son, Mike, graduated from Stanford University, where he is a member of the Stanford Athletic Hall of Fame in both football and baseball. Mike was drafted by the New York Yankees (1979, 1983), the Oakland Athletics (1982) and in the NFL by the Los Angeles Raiders (1983), where he was a member of the 1984 Super Bowl Championship Team.

See also
1960 Major League Baseball expansion draft

References

External links
Career statistics and player information from Baseball Almanac, or Baseball Reference, or Baseball Reference (minors), or Retrosheet

1931 births
1999 deaths
American military personnel of the Korean War
Baseball players from Syracuse, New York
Burlington Flints players
Cincinnati Redlegs players
Cincinnati Reds players
Havana Sugar Kings players
Jersey City Jerseys players
Lockport Reds players
Major League Baseball catchers
Memphis Chickasaws players
Nashville Vols players
Ogden Reds players
Rapiños de Occidente players
Seattle Rainiers players
Syracuse Chiefs players
Syracuse Orangemen baseball players
Washington Senators (1961–1971) players
American expatriate baseball players in Cuba